Bojan Pavićević (born 20 October 1975), is former Serbian futsal player who played as winger for Marbo Intermezzo and the Serbia national futsal team. He is currently director of Serbia futsal teams.

References

External links
UEFA profile

1975 births
Living people
Serbian men's futsal players